Cache Peak may refer to:

Cache Peak (California)
Cache Peak (Idaho)
Cache Peak (Wyoming)

References